Eastern Orthodox theology is the theology particular to the Eastern Orthodox Church. It is characterized by monotheistic Trinitarianism, belief in the Incarnation of the essentially divine Logos or only-begotten Son of God, a balancing of cataphatic theology with apophatic theology, a hermeneutic defined by a Sacred Tradition, a catholic ecclesiology, a robust of the person, and a principally recapitulative and therapeutic soteriology.

Holy Tradition

Ecclesiology

The Eastern Orthodox Church considers itself to be the one, holy, catholic and apostolic church established by Jesus Christ and his Apostles. The Eastern Orthodox Church asserts to have been very careful in preserving these traditions. Eastern Orthodox Christians regard the Christian Bible as a collection of inspired texts that sprang out of this tradition, not the other way around; and the choices made in the compilation of the New Testament as having come from comparison with already firmly established faith. The Bible has come to be a very important part of tradition, but not the only part.

Tradition also includes the Nicene Creed, the decrees of the Seven Ecumenical Councils, the writings of the Church Fathers, as well as Eastern Orthodox laws (canons), liturgical books, icons, etc.

Consensus of the Fathers

Eastern Orthodoxy interprets truth based on three witnesses: the consensus of the Holy Fathers of the Church; the ongoing teaching of the Holy Spirit guiding the life of the Church through the nous, or mind of the Church (also called the "Universal Consciousness of the Church"), which is believed to be the Mind of Christ; and the praxis of the church (including among other things asceticism, liturgy, hymnography, and iconography).

The consensus of the Church over time defines its catholicity—that which is believed at all times by the entire Church. St. Vincent of Lerins wrote in his Commonitoria (434 AD) that Church doctrine, like the human body, develops over time while still keeping its original identity: "[I]n the Orthodox Church itself, all possible care must be taken, that we hold that faith which has been believed everywhere, always, by all." Those who disagree with that consensus are not accepted as authentic "Fathers." All theological concepts must be in agreement with that consensus. Even those considered to be authentic "Fathers" may have some theological opinions that are not universally shared, but are not thereby considered heretical. Some Holy Fathers have even made statements that were later defined as heretical, but their mistakes do not exclude them from position of authority. Thus an Eastern Orthodox Christian is not bound to agree with every opinion of every Father, but rather with the consensus of the Fathers, and then only on those matters about which the church is dogmatic.

Some of the greatest theologians in the history of the church come from the 4th century, including the Cappadocian Fathers and the Three Hierarchs. However, the Eastern Orthodox do not consider the "Patristic era" to be a thing of the past, but that it continues in an unbroken succession of enlightened teachers (i.e., the saints, especially those who have left us theological writings) from the Apostles to the present day.

Scripture

From the Eastern Orthodox perspective, the Bible represents those texts approved by the Church for the purpose of conveying the most important parts of what it already believes. The Church more or less accepted the preexisting Greek Septuagint version of the Hebrew scriptures as handed down to them from the Jews; but the New Testament texts were written to members or congregations of the Church which already existed. These texts were not universally considered canonical until the church reviewed, edited, accepted and ratified them in 368 AD.

The Greeks have always understood that certain sections of Scripture, while containing moral lessons and complex truth, do not necessarily have to be interpreted literally. The Eastern Orthodox also understand that a particular passage may be interpreted on many different levels simultaneously. However, interpretation is not a matter of personal opinion. For this reason, Eastern Orthodox depend upon the consensus of the Holy Fathers to provide a trustworthy guide to the accurate interpretation of Scripture.

Eastern Orthodox Christianity is a strongly biblical church. A large portion of the Daily Office is made up of either direct portions of scripture (Psalms, lections) or allusions to scriptural passages or themes (hymnography such as that contained in the Octoechos, Triodion, Pentecostarion, etc.) The entire Psalter is read in the course of a week (twice during Great Lent). The entire New Testament (with the exception of the Book of Revelation) is read during the course of the year, and numerous passages are read from the Old Testament at Vespers and other services.

The Gospel Book is considered to be an icon of Christ, and is placed in a position of honour on the Holy Table (altar). The Gospel Book is traditionally not covered in leather (the skin of a dead animal) because the Word of God is considered to be life-giving. Traditionally, the Gospel is covered in gold or cloth. Eastern Orthodox Christians are encouraged to read and study the Bible daily, especially making use of the writings of the Holy Fathers for guidance.

Recent essays have been written by various contemporary Eastern Orthodox scholars which attempt to reconcile and react to both the creationist interpretation of Genesis 1-2 and the Darwinian theory of human evolution.

God

Trinity

Eastern Orthodox Christians believe in a monotheistic conception of God (God is only one), which is both transcendent (wholly independent of, and removed from, the material universe) and immanent (involved in the material universe). In discussing God's relationship to his creation, Eastern Orthodox theology distinguishes between God's eternal essence, which is totally transcendent, and his uncreated energies, which is how he reaches humanity. The God who is transcendent and the God who touches mankind are one and the same. That is, these energies are not something that proceed from God or that God produces, but rather they are God himself: distinct, yet inseparable from God's inner being.

Eastern Orthodox Christians  believe in a single God who is both three and one (triune); the Father, Son, and Holy Spirit, "one in essence and undivided". The Trinity, three distinct, divine persons (hypostases), without overlap or modality among them, who each have one divine essence (ousia, Greek: οὐσία)—uncreated, immaterial, and eternal. The Father is eternal and not begotten and does not proceed from any, the Son is eternal and begotten of the Father, and the Holy Spirit is eternal and proceeds from the Father. Eastern Orthodox doctrine regarding the Trinity is summarised in the Nicene Creed. The essence of God being that which is beyond human comprehension and cannot be defined or approached by human understanding.

Christology

Eastern Orthodox Christians believe the Word of God is one person in two natures, both fully divine and fully human, perfectly God (τέλειος Θεός) and perfectly man (τέλειος άνθρωπος) united in the person of Jesus Christ, in a unique event known as "the Incarnation". Throughout the ages this has been a point of contention between schismatic Christian theological factions (heterodox) and the mainstream body of Christian believers (orthodox). Christ had a divine will, or set of desires and spiritual incentives, and a human will with fleshly drives. He had a human body, human mind, and human spirit able to be tempted with sin and to suffer the same way as we would. In this way God is said to have suffered and died in the flesh of Jesus, although the divine nature is itself impassible and immortal.

Eastern Orthodox Christians believe that Jesus of Nazareth is the promised Messiah of the Jews, the God of Israel come to be with his people, the Redeemer of the human race who saves the world from sin and its effects, the comprehensible self-revelation of the incomprehensible God, and the pre-eternal Son begotten of the Father before all ages: "the only-begotten Son of God, begotten of the Father before all worlds (æons), Light of Light, very God of very God, begotten, not made, being of one substance with the Father." He is said to have been begotten timelessly as God without a mother and begotten in history as man without a father.

Eastern Orthodox Christians believe in the betrayal, trial, execution, burial and resurrection of Jesus Christ, that he truly rose from the dead on the third day following his crucifixion. The feast of the resurrection of Christ, which is called "Easter" in Germanic languages, is known as Pascha in the Eastern Orthodox Church. This is the Aramaic variant (the language spoken at the time of Jesus) of the Hebrew Pesach, meaning "Passover". The resurrection of Christ is the Christian Passover. Pascha is called "the Feast of Feasts" and is considered the greatest feast of all the Church's liturgical feasts, including the feasts of the Nativity (Christmas) and the Annunciation.

Essence and energies

In discussing God's relationship to his creation a distinction is made within Eastern Orthodox theology between God's eternal essence and uncreated energies, though it is understood that this does not compromise the divine simplicity. Energies and essence are both inseparably God. The divine energies are the expressions of divine being in action according to Eastern Orthodox doctrine, whereas the persons of the Trinity are divine by nature. Hence, created beings are united to God through participation in the divine energies and not the divine essence or ousia.

Theodicy
The Eastern Orthodox theologian Olivier Clement, wrote:
 From an Eastern Orthodox perspective the concept of theodicy and the problem of evil stem both from a misconceived anthropology of man. Early on in the history of the Christian community Gnostics attacked the God of the Jews and the story of cosmic creation contained in the Torah. They regarded this God as inferior for allowing his creation to be imperfect and negative events to occur. Western Roman Catholic philosophers (such as Augustine, Anselm of Canterbury, and Thomas Aquinas) have attempted to develop theodicies for the Judeo-Christian God. 
The Church taught (against the Gnostics) that the cosmos is fallen not because God created it dysfunctional, but because humanity misused their freedom to love and chose a path separating them from God by idolatrously proclaiming their self-sufficiency. When humanity made this choice, it is taught in Eastern patristics, all of reality, i.e. every sphere of human experience, "fell" and was corrupted. The Eastern Orthodox understanding of creation stands in radical contrast to the fatalist approach to sin as taught by the Gnostics and later by strict Augustinians. God created sarx ("the flesh") as a provision for humanity, as led by the Spirit of God, to remedy its fallen state by using the time on earth to seek and reconcile with God, even as our common sarx separates us from Him.

Eastern Orthodox authors see theodicy as an exclusively Western preoccupation. Pavel Florensky in The Pillar and Ground of the Truth: An Essay in Orthodox Theodicy in Twelve Letters; Archbishop Stylianos in Theodicy and Eschatology: A Fundamental Orthodox Viewpoint in Theodicy and Eschatology (Australian Theological Forum Press 2005 ); Tsunami and Theodicy by David B. Hart, an Eastern Orthodox theologian and author of The Beauty of the Infinite; "The Lady and the Wench": A Practical Theodicy in Russian Literature by Paul Valliere; and with regard to one of the Fathers of the Church Irenaeus' Theodicy.

Sin

The Eastern Orthodox approach to sin, and how it is dealt with, shuns perceived Western "legalism." Following rules strictly without the heart "being in it" does not help a believer with his salvation. Sin is not fundamentally about transgressing a Divine law; rather, it stands for any behavior which "misses the mark," that is, fails to live up to the higher goal of conforming to God's nature, which is love.

Thus, in the Eastern Orthodox tradition sin is not viewed primarily as a guilty stain on the soul that needs to be wiped out, but rather as a pervading sickness or a failure to achieve the goal of a truly human life, fulfilling one's Divine design and function as the created likeness of God. Sin, therefore, implies the impetus to become something other than what we were created for, rather than guilt for violating a commandment. Because each person's experience is unique, conquering one's sinful habits requires individual attention and correction. The ultimate goal for this salvific process is to become divinized, to reflect the Divine likeness by becoming Christ-like in one's thought, life and behavior.

A traditional practice of Eastern Orthodoxy is, as in other apostolic churches, to have a spiritual mentor and guide to whom one confesses and who treats the sin on an individual basis. An experienced and spiritually mature guide will know how and when to apply strictness in dealing with sin and when to administer mercy.

Original Sin
In Eastern Orthodoxy,  God created humanity with the ability to freely love him and gave humans a direction to follow. Man (Adam) and Woman (Eve) chose rather to disobey God by eating from the Tree of Knowledge of Good and Evil, thus changing the "perfect" mode of existence of Man into a flawed or "fallen" one. Since then a fallen nature and all that has come from it is the result of this "Ancestral Sin". Because of the entrance of death into the world through Adam, all humans end up sinning and follow in his ways (Rom. 5:12, Heb. 2:14-15).  Through the union of humanity with divinity in Jesus Christ the mode of existence of humanity is restored in the Person of Christ. Those who are incorporated in him may participate in this renewal of the perfect mode of existence, be saved from sin and death, and be united to God in deification (theosis). Ancestral sin is cleansed in humans through baptism or, in the case of the Theotokos, the moment Christ took form within her.

Man is not seen as inherently guilty of the sin committed by Adam, a view that differs from the Roman Catholic doctrine of original sin, where Adam is conceived as the federal head and legal representative of the human race, as first articulated by Latin Father Augustine of Hippo,  According to the Orthodox, humanity inherited the consequences of Adam's sin, not the guilt. The difference stems from Augustine's interpretation of a Latin translation of Romans 5:12 to mean that through Adam all men sinned, whereas the Orthodox, reading in Greek, interpret it as meaning that all of humanity sins as a consequence of the inheritance from Adam of a mortal nature. The Orthodox Church does not teach that all are born guilty and deserving of damnation, and Protestant doctrines such as predestination which are derived from the Augustinian theory of original sin and are especially prominent in the Lutheran and Calvinist traditions, are not a part of Orthodox belief.

In the book Ancestral Sin, John S. Romanides addresses the concept of original sin, which he understands as an inheritance of ancestral sin from previous generations. Romanides asserts that original sin (understood as innate guilt) is not an apostolic doctrine of the Church nor cohesive with the Eastern Orthodox faith, but rather an unfortunate innovation of later church fathers such as Augustine. In the realm of ascetics it is by choice, not birth, that one takes on the sins of the world.

Hell

The Eastern Orthodox Church, as well as the Non-Chalcedonian Churches (i.e., Oriental Orthodoxy and Assyrian Church of the East), teach that both the elect and the lost enter into the presence of God after death, and that the elect experience this presence as light and rest, while the lost experience it as darkness and torment.
The Orthodox see this doctrine as supported by Scripture and by the patristic tradition. Hell as professed in the East is neither the absence of God, nor the ontological separation of the soul from the presence of God, but rather the opposite—Heaven and Hell are the fully manifest divine presence, experienced either pleasantly as peace and joy or unpleasantly as shame and anguish, depending upon one's spiritual state and preparedness.

Satan

In Eastern Orthodoxy, Satan is one of the three enemies of humanity along with sin and death.

Salvation

Disrupted communion with God
Eastern Orthodox Christians hold that man was originally created in communion with God, but through acting in a manner contrary to his own nature (which is intrinsically ordered to communion with God), he disrupted that communion.  Because of man's refusal to fulfill the "image and likeness of God" within him, corruption and the sickness of sin whose consequence is death entered man's mode of existence. But when Jesus came into the world he was perfect man and perfect God united in the divine Hypostasis of the Logos, the Second Person of the Holy Trinity. Through his assumption of human nature, human existence was restored, enabling human beings to bring creation to its fullness through participation in divinity by incorporation into Jesus Christ. St. Athanasius:

Salvation, or "being saved," therefore, refers to this process of being saved from death and corruption and the fate of hell. The Orthodox Church believes that its teachings and practices represent the true path to participation in the gifts of God. Yet, it should be understood that the Orthodox do not believe that you must be Orthodox to participate in salvation. God is merciful to all. The Orthodox believe that there is nothing that a person (Orthodox or non-Orthodox) can do to earn salvation. It is rather a gift from God. However, this gift of relationship has to be accepted by the believer, since God will not force salvation on humanity.  Man is free to reject the gift of salvation continually offered by God. To be saved, man must work together with God in a synergeia whereby his entire being, including his will, effort and actions, are perfectly conformed with, and united to, the divine. Vladimir Lossky:

Incarnation

Prior to Christ's incarnation on Earth it was man's "fate", when he died, because of the fall of Adam, to be separated from God. Because man distorted his mode of existence through acting against what was natural to him - thus disobeying God - humanity placed itself in a terrible and inescapable position. God, however, raised humanity's fallen nature by uniting his divine nature with our human nature. This he accomplished through the Incarnation of the Second Person of the Holy Trinity, who assumed human nature, thus becoming man, whilst retaining the divine nature proper to divinity. It is fundamental for Orthodox Christians that they accept Christ as both God and Man, both natures complete. This is viewed as the only way of escaping the hell of separation from God. The incarnation unites humanity to divinity. Orthodox Christians believe that because of that Incarnation, everything is different. It is said that St Basil stated: "We are to strive to become little gods, within God, little jesus christs within Jesus Christ". In other words, Orthodox Christians must seek perfection in all things in their lives; and strive to acquire Godly virtue. It is believed that God, through assuming humanity, makes it possible for man to participate in divinity. Orthodox Christians do not believe in becoming "separate" gods in the pagan sense; rather, they believe that humans may participate in the divine energies of God without loss of their personal particularity. Humans, therefore, become by grace what God is by nature ("God became man so that man might become a god.", De Incarnatione, Athanasius of Alexandria).

Resurrection

The Resurrection of Christ is the central event in the liturgical year of the Orthodox Church and is understood in literal terms as a real historical event. Jesus Christ, the Son of God, was crucified and died, descended into Hades, rescued all the souls held there as a consequence of their having sinned; and then, because Hades could not restrain the infinite God, rose from the dead, thus saving all humanity. Through these events, he released humanity from the bonds of Hades and then came back to the living as man and God. That each individual human may partake of this immortality, which would have been impossible without the Resurrection, is the main promise held out by God in his New Covenant with humanity, according to Orthodox Christian tradition.

Every holy day of the Orthodox liturgical year relates to the Resurrection directly or indirectly. Every Sunday of the year is dedicated to celebrating the Resurrection; many Orthodox believers will refrain from kneeling or prostrating on Sundays in observance thereof. Even in the liturgical commemorations of the Passion of Christ during Holy Week, there are frequent allusions to the ultimate victory at its completion.

Deification
The ultimate goal of the Orthodox Christian is to achieve theosis ("deification") or conformity to and intimate union with God. This is sometimes expressed thus: "God became man so that Man might become god." Some of the greatest saints have achieved, in this life, a measure of this process. The individual who achieves theosis never realizes his accomplishment, as his perfect humility keeps him blind to pride. Salvation therefore is not merely an escape from the eternal bondage of death, but an entrance to life in Christ here and now.

Noetic renewal as spiritual therapy
A central concept in Eastern Christianity is nous (typically translated "mind" or "understanding"), the apperceptive and relational faculty of attention or awareness which is the center, heart, or spirit of the person. Nous is the eye or soul of the person. It is the nous that is both logical and intuitive understanding. It was humanity's nous that was damaged by Adam's sin and fall and it was this damaged consciousness that each human by birth now receives.

It is the nous which has to be healed and nourished by means of illumination (see theoria). In Orthodox thought, the Church offers a therapeutic treatment for pain, suffering, and the search for value in existence. Orthodox Christianity is healing or therapeutic, and works in each individual to overcome their passions (i.e. evil thoughts, pasts, addictions).

As a reorientation of the self, faith (pistis) is sometimes used interchangeably with noesis in Eastern Christianity. Faith is the intuitive, noetic experience of the nous or spirit. Transformative faith is a gift from God and among his uncreated operations.

According to anti-Latin polemicist John Romanides, Western Christianity does not offer a spiritual cure for spiritual problems, but expresses salvation as a worldly (religious) goal in the pursuit of happiness, rather than seeking to attain the vision of God and transcend the self. Spiritual work is done to reconcile the heart and mind, by putting the mind in the heart, and then contemplating through our intuition. According to Lossky, rationalism reduces man and nature to cold mechanical concepts, interpretations and symbols of reality not reality in and of itself.

Mother of God

A great many traditions revolve around the Ever-Virgin Mary, the Theotokos, the Birth-giver in Incarnation of the preeternal Word of God. It is believed by Orthodox Christians that she was and remained a virgin before and after Christ's birth. Many of the Church's beliefs concerning the Virgin Mary are reflected in the apocryphal text "The Nativity of Mary", which was not included in scripture, but is considered to be accurate in its description of events. The child Mary was consecrated at the age of three to serve in the temple as a temple virgin. Zachariah, at that time High Priest of the Temple, did the unthinkable and carried Mary into the Holy of Holies as a sign of her importance – that she herself would become the ark in which God would take form. At the age of twelve she was required to give up her position and marry, but she desired to remain forever a virgin in dedication to God. And so it was decided to marry her to a close relative, Joseph, an uncle or cousin, an older man, a widower, who would take care of her and allow her to retain her virginity. And so it was that when the time came she submitted to God's will and allowed the Christ to take form within her. It is believed by many Orthodox that she, in her life, committed no sin; however, the Orthodox do not accept the Roman Catholic doctrine of the  Immaculate conception. The Theotokos was subject to original sin as the Orthodox understand it, yet she lived her life stainless and pure. In the theology of the Orthodox Church, it is most important to understand that Christ, from the very moment of conception, was fully God and fully man. Therefore, Orthodox Christians believe that it is correct to say that Mary is indeed the Theotokos, the Birth-giver of God, and that she is the greatest of all humans ever to have lived (except, of course, for Christ her Son). The term 'Theotokos' has tremendous theological significance to Orthodox Christians, as it was at the center of the Christological debates of the 4th and 5th centuries AD.

After her great role was accomplished, the Church believes she remained a virgin, continuing to serve God in all ways. She traveled much with her son, and was present both at his Passion on the Cross and at his ascension into heaven. It is also believed that she was the first to know of her son's resurrection – the Archangel Gabriel appearing to her once more revealed it to her. It is believed she lived to the age of seventy and called all the apostles to her before she died. According to tradition Saint Thomas arrived late and was not present at her death. Desiring to kiss her hand one last time he opened her tomb but her body was gone. The Orthodox believe she was assumed into heaven bodily; however, unlike in the Roman Catholic Church, it is not held dogmatically and the holy day is usually referred to as the Feast of the Dormition, not that of the Assumption.

Saints, relics, and the deceased

In the Eastern Orthodox Church a saint is defined as anyone who is currently in Heaven, whether recognized here on earth or not. By this definition, Adam and Eve, Moses, the various prophets, martyrs for the faith, the angels and archangels are all given the title of Saint. There is a service in the Orthodox Church in which a saint is formally recognized by the entire Church, called glorification. This does not, however, "make" a saint but simply accords him or her a place on the calendar with regular services in his honor. Recently, in order to avoid abuses, the Ecumenical Patriarchate in Constantinople has begun to follow the longstanding practice of other local Orthodox churches by issuing special encyclical letters (tomoi) in which the Church acknowledges the popular veneration of a saint. Glorification usually happens after believers have already begun venerating a saint. There are numerous small local followings of countless saints that have not yet been recognized by the entire Orthodox Church.

A strong element in favor of glorification can be the perceived miraculous condition of physical remains (relics), although that alone is not considered sufficient. In some Orthodox countries it is the custom to re-use graves after three to five years due to limited space. Bones are respectfully washed and placed in an ossuary, often with the person's name written on the skull. Occasionally when a body is exhumed something believed to be miraculous occurs to reveal the person's sainthood. There have been numerous occurrences where the exhumed bones are said to suddenly give off a wonderful fragrance, like flowers; or sometimes the body is said to be found incorrupt despite having not been embalmed (traditionally the Orthodox do not embalm the dead) and having been buried for three years.

For the Orthodox, body and soul both comprise the person, and in the end, body and soul will be reunited; therefore, the body of a saint shares in the holiness of the soul of the saint.

Orthodox venerate saints and ask for their prayers, and consider them brothers and sisters in Christ Jesus. Saints are venerated and loved and asked to intercede for salvation, but they are not given the worship accorded to God, because their holiness is believed to come from God. In fact, anyone who worships a saint, relics, or icons is to be excommunicated. As a general rule only clergy will touch relics in order to move them or carry them in procession; however, in veneration the faithful will kiss the relic to show love and respect toward the saint. Every altar in every Orthodox church contains relics, usually of a martyr. The Church building interiors are covered with the icons of saints.

The Orthodox Church sees baptism, both for infants and adults, as the moment one is incorporated into Christ. The person baptised is given a new name, usually the name of a saint. As well as birthdays, Orthodox celebrate the day of the saint for whom the person is named (the person's name day).

See also
Byzantine philosophy
Russian philosophy
History of Eastern Orthodox theology
History of Eastern Orthodox theology in the 20th century
Palamism
Essence–energies distinction
Theosis (Eastern Christian theology)
Christian contemplation
Phronema
Mariology
Theological differences between the Catholic Church and the Eastern Orthodox Church
Ecclesiastical differences between the Catholic Church and the Eastern Orthodox Church

Notes

References

Sources

Further reading
Vladimir Lossky. The Mystical Theology of the Eastern Church. St Vladimir's Seminary Press, 1997. James Clarke & Co Ltd, 1991.
Vladimir Lossky. Orthodox Theology: An Introduction. SVS Press, 2001.
Vladimir Lossky. In the Image and Likeness of God. SVS Press, 1997.
Vladimir Lossky. The Vision of God. SVS Press, 1997.
Kallistos Ware. The Orthodox Way. St Vladimir's Seminary Press, 1995. 
Tr. Mother Mary and Archimandrite Kallistos Ware. The Lenten Triodion. St. Tikhon's Seminary Press, 2002) - first published by Faber and Faber Ltd., 1978
Kallistos Ware. The Inner Kingdom: Collected Works, Vol. 1. St Vladimir's Seminary Press, 2000. )
Kallistos Ware. In the Image of the Trinity: Collected Works, Vol. 2. St Vladimir's Seminary Press, 2006. )
Communion and Intercommunion. Light & Life, 1980. )
Bishop Kallistos Ware. How Are We Saved?: The Understanding of Salvation in the Orthodox Tradition. Light & Life, 1996. )
Protopresbyter Michael Pomazansky. Orthodox Dogmatic Theology: A Concise Exposition. St Herman of Alaska Brotherhood Press, 1994. Online version 
Let There Be Light: An Orthodox Christian Theory of Human Evolution For the 21st Century. Theandros, Summer 2008. )

External links
 An Online Orthodox Catechism published by the Russian Orthodox Church